Ribeira Brava is a concelho (municipality) of Cape Verde. Situated in the eastern part of the island of São Nicolau, it covers 65% of the island area (224.8 km2), and is home to 59% of its population (7,580 at the 2010 census). Its seat is the city Ribeira Brava.

Subdivisions
The municipality consists of two freguesias (civil parishes):
Nossa Senhora da Lapa
Nossa Senhora do Rosário

History
The municipality was created in 2005, when the older municipality of São Nicolau was split in two, the southwestern part becoming the Municipality of Tarrafal de São Nicolau and the northeastern part becoming the Municipality of Ribeira Brava.

Demography

Politics
Since 2016, the local party GIRB is the ruling party of the municipality. The results of the latest elections, in 2016:

Persons
Amílcar Spencer Lopes (b. 1948), president of the National Assembly between 1991 and 1996
João Lopes Filho (b. 1950), anthropologist and linguist

References

External links
Official website of the municipality 

 
Municipalities of Cape Verde
Geography of São Nicolau, Cape Verde
2005 establishments in Cape Verde